The Euro Hockey League 2017–18 was the eleventh season of the Euro Hockey League, Europe's premier club field hockey tournament. Round One was held in Barcelona and the round of 16 and quarterfinals in Rotterdam. The semi-finals, third place game and the final were held in Bloemendaal.

Association team allocation
A total of 24 teams from 12 of the 45 EHF member associations participate in the 2018–19 Euro Hockey League. The association ranking based on the EHL country coefficients is used to determine the number of participating teams for each association:
 Associations 1–4 each have three teams qualify.
 Associations 5–8 each have two teams qualify.
 Associations 9–12 each have one team qualify.

EHL Rankings

Qualified teams

Round One
All times are local (UTC+01:00)

If a game is won, the winning team receives 5 points. A draw results in both teams receiving 2 points. A loss gives the losing team 1 point unless the losing team loses with more than 3 goals, then they receive 0 points.

The Euro Hockey League trialed a new scoring system for the season 2017–18:
 For every Field Goal and a Penalty Stroke Goal scored in a match NOT resulting from a Penalty Corner = 2 goals
 For every Penalty Corner scored in a match = 1 goal
 For every goal scored from a Penalty Stroke resulting from a Penalty Corner situation = 1 goal
 In a shoot-out competition a goal from a direct Shoot-out and a Penalty Stroke = 1 goal

Group A

Group B

Group C

Group D

Knockout stage

Round of 16 and the quarter-finals were played in Rotterdam, Netherlands between the 30th of March and the 2nd of April 2018. The semi-finals, third place match and the final will be played in Bloemendaal, Netherlands.

Bracket

Round of 16

Ranking matches

Quarter-finals

Semi-finals

Third place

Final

See also
2018 EuroHockey Club Champions Cup

References

External links 
 Official Website (English)
 YouTube Channel for EHL
 European Hockey Federation

Euro Hockey League
2017–18 in European field hockey